The Coahuila mass graves was the mass murder of 38 people near the city of Piedras Negras, Coahuila, Mexico on 3 June 2011. The three clandestine mass graves where the bodies were exhumed were found by the Mexican military and authorized personnel after an anonymous call notified them of the location where the decaying bodies were. The investigators found buttons, shirts, coins, and watches. The mass graves were purposely covered with soil and grass to simulate a pasture. All of the bodies were burned to death.

See also
 List of massacres in Mexico
 Mexican Drug War
 2011 San Fernando massacre
 2011 Durango massacres
 Nuevo León mass graves

References

2011 murders in Mexico
Mass graves
Mass graves
Mass graves
Mass murder in 2011
Massacres in Mexico
Battles of the Mexican drug war
Organized crime events in Mexico